Charles-Valentin Alkan wrote 25 preludes for solo piano or organ in 1844; they were published as his Op. 31 in 1847. These preludes span all 24 major and minor keys, plus an additional 25th prelude in C major.

The Preludes, Op. 31

Lentement, C major 
Assez lentement, F minor 
Dans le genre ancien, D major
Prière du soir, F minor
Psaume 150me, D major
Ancienne mélodie de la synagogue, G minor
Librement mais sans secousses, E major
La chanson de la folle au bord de la mer, A minor
Placiditas, E major
Dans le style fugué, A minor
Un petit rien, F major
Le temps qui n'est plus, B minor
J'étais endormie, mais mon cœur veillait, G major
Rapidement, B minor
Dans le genre gothique, G major
Assez lentement, C minor
Rêve d'amour, A major
Sans trop de mouvement, C minor
Prière du matin, A major
Modérement vite et bien caracterise, D minor
Doucement, B major
Anniversaire, E minor
Assez vite, B major
Étude de velocite, E minor
Prière, C major

Reception 
Alkan's contemporary François-Joseph Fétis cautioned critics and the public not to compare Op. 31 with the works of Chopin:"We must not expect to find in this artist's volume of preludes a flurry of fast notes by means of which certain pianists presage the skill before the performance of a piece.  Alkan is a person of heart and mind; his preludes are dream-like which conceal a very calculated and finished art form."

See also
 List of compositions by Charles-Valentin Alkan
 Music written in all major and/or minor keys

References

External links
 

Compositions by Charles-Valentin Alkan
Preludes (Alkan)
1844 compositions
Alkan
Alkan
Compositions for organ